John Stobbs was a 19th-century English songwriter and poet who lived in the Tyneside district. Many of his writings are in the Geordie dialect.

Known details 
There is little information on John Stobbs, except that he was (like William Egglestone) noted for his humorous monologues and appeared to either subscribe to other books, like the Descriptive and Historical Account of the Town and County of Newcastle-upon-Tyne by Eneas Mackenzie, published c. 1827, or for him or his works to be quoted in the works by the work's author.

Works 
The following songs have been attributed to John Stobbs, all of which appear in The Shields Garland:
Blow the Wind Southerly – A note at the foot of the song may attribute authorship to Alexander Brighton 
 Coal trade (The) – In some places this is attributed to William Brockie, but a note on the  manuscript states that it was “touched up” by Brockie
 Fitter he has Daughters three, Drive away the Waggons, Hinny (The) - A Sailor's song at the capstan
 Jenny Chowk’d the Bairn
 Liberty for the sailors, a Shields song for the days of the Press-gang
 Pound of tea
 Sweepy's Lovely Daughter (The)
 Tally I, O, the grinder or A Sailor's Song at the Capstan
 Tynemouth (or "Tynemouth Abbey" (music by Thomas Haswell)

Known recordings 
Blow the Wind Southerly - A recording available on MWM Records sung by Judy Dinning
Liberty for the sailors - this song also appears in Northumbrian Minstrelsy by Bruce and Stokoe, 1882 - A recording available on MWM Records sung by Jane Wade
Sweepy's Lovely Daughter (The) - A recording available on MWM records sung by Benny Graham
 Tally I, O, the grinder - A recording available on MWM records  sung by Ray Stubbs and the Hush

See also 
Geordie dialect words

References

External links
FARNE - Folk Archive Resource North East Shields Garlands Number 1
Durham & Tyneside Dialect Group - On dialect
Geordie dialect
Allan’s Illustrated Edition of Tyneside songs and readings
Descriptive and Historical Account of the Town and County of Newcastle-upon-Tyne, by Eneas MacKenzie, published c1827

English male poets
English songwriters
People from Newcastle upon Tyne (district)
Musicians from Tyne and Wear
1800s deaths
1800s births
Geordie songwriters
19th-century English musicians